Jules Tessier (April 16, 1852 – January 6, 1934) was a Canadian lawyer and politician.

He was born in Quebec City, Quebec, the son of Ulric-Joseph Tessier and Mariane Perrault. He was educated at the Quebec seminary and at the Jesuit college in Montreal, and was admitted to the Quebec Bar in 1874. He was created a Queen's Counsel in 1899. A practising lawyer, he ran unsuccessfully for Mayor of Quebec City in 1894. He was elected to the Legislative Assembly of Quebec in the riding of Portneuf in the 1886 election. A Liberal, he was re-elected in 1890, 1892, 1897, and acclaimed in 1900. From 1897 to 1901, he was Speaker of the Legislative Assembly. He resigned in 1903, when he was appointed to the Senate of Canada representing the senatorial division of De la Durantaye, Quebec. A Liberal, he died in office in 1934.

His brother, Auguste Tessier, was also a Member and Speaker of the Legislative Assembly as well as a Cabinet minister.

References

External links
 
 

1852 births
1934 deaths
Canadian senators from Quebec
Quebec Liberal Party MNAs
Liberal Party of Canada senators
Politicians from Quebec City
Presidents of the National Assembly of Quebec
Lawyers in Quebec
Canadian King's Counsel
Université Laval alumni